Rebecca Swanson (born November 20, 1973) is an American powerlifter and professional wrestler.  Becca Swanson holds several powerlifting world records for women, including the heaviest squat, heaviest deadlift and the heaviest bench press. Due to her accomplishments in professional powerlifting competition and her multiple world records across many weightlifting disciplines she is called "the world‘s strongest woman" or referred to as "the strongest woman on the planet" or the "strongest woman of all time".

Early life
Swanson was born November 20, 1973, in Papillion, Nebraska.  She graduated from University of Nebraska-Lincoln in 1998 with a Bachelor of Science in Mechanical Engineering.

Bodybuilding, powerlifting, and strongwoman
Becca Swanson started out in 1996 with the desire to be a bodybuilder, but ended up with powerlifting. After a few shows, according to her, the larger, more muscular women had fallen out of favor in bodybuilding. She was told that she was just too big for bodybuilding and that motivated her join powerlifting. At the same time, she was very close to some world powerlifting records and thought it best to focus there. She is also the first woman ever to be part of the 2000 pounds club which means she is the first of two women ever to total plus 2000 pounds in a meet on the same day. She has also competed in strongwoman contests, starting in 2002. She is also known for doing 35 kg dumbbell curls for 10 repetitions.

Professional wrestling

Harley Race's Wrestling Academy/World League Wrestling (2009-2010)
Swanson is a professional wrestler for Harley Race's World League Wrestling based in Eldon, Missouri.

Swanson (as a heel) won the WLW Ladies Championship from Amy Hennig on October 3, 2009, at the WLW Tenth Anniversary Show. On March 12, 2010, Swanson would lose the title to Lucy Mendez in a triple threat match which also included Hennig. On March 13, Swanson was unsuccessful in capturing the WLW Women's Championship for a second time as Hennig would defeat both Swanson and Mendez in a triple threat match.

WPC/APF/WPO world records (equipped)
198+ Weight Class -  Squat
198+ Weight Class -  Bench
198+ Weight Class -  Deadlift
198+ Weight Class -  Total (best lifts in one meet)
 Weight Class -  Squat
 Weight Class -  Bench
 Weight Class -  Deadlift
 Weight Class -  Total

Powerlifting profile
Height: 
Weight: 
Calves: 
Quads:  
Shoulders: 
Biceps:

Championships and accomplishments

Bodybuilding
Ms. Midwest (1 time)
Ms. Nebraska (1 time)
Ms. Rocky Mountain (1 time)

Powerlifting
World Powerlifting Congress
90 kg Class
710.5 kg Total (June 14, 2002)
90+ kg Class
377.5 kg Squat (June 4, 2005)
272.5 kg Bench press (June 4, 2005)
290.5 kg Deadlift (June 4, 2005)
873 kg Total (June 4, 2005)

Professional wrestling
World League Wrestling
WLW Ladies Championship (1 time)

References

External links
Official website
Old Official Site
Bodybuilding.com Interview
Profile at AMG-Lite
Becca Swanson's CageMatch.de Profile
World Record list

Female powerlifters
Strongwomen
Living people
American female bodybuilders
American female professional wrestlers
1973 births
People from Papillion, Nebraska
21st-century American women